NAVCIS or Navcis can mean:

 NavCIS, the former CompuServe Navigator
 NAVCIS, the British National Vehicle Crime Intelligence Service